Blood shift has at least two separate meanings: 

 In medicine, it is synonymous with left shift
 In diving physiology, it is part of the diving reflex